Scleroderma meridionale is a puffball-like fungus in the family Sclerodermataceae. It was originally described in 1970 from Portugal, but is also found in North America. The peridium is up to 2 mm thick and has a dry, roughened surface colored tan to yellow. Mature fruit bodies tend to split into irregular lobes, revealing a dark brownish- to blackish-gray spore mass (gleba). The spores are spherical with small spikes and measure 12–20 µm. Scleroderma meridionale grows in sandy areas, where it fruits singly or scattered in a partially buried state. Its edibility is unknown.

See also
List of Scleroderma species

References

External links

Boletales
Fungi described in 1971
Fungi of Europe
Fungi of North America
Puffballs